Strumella is a genus of moths in the family Lasiocampidae, first described by Wallengren in 1858.

External links

Lasiocampidae